Ervin L. Jordan, Jr. is an Associate Professor and Research Archivist at the University of Virginia, Albert and Shirley Small Special Collections Library. He has published several books and articles, as well as given lectures and taught workshops, on the American Civil War and African American history. He has appeared on television several times as a consulting historian in matters of African American history and genealogy, as well lectured at conferences, universities and events, some which were televised on C-CPAN. He has written several books and been awarded for his research in the Civil War and African American history and is one of the leading figures in developing black American history.

Education 
Jordan holds history degrees and graduated with honors from both Norfolk State University and Old Dominion University. Since 2015, he has been an affiliated faculty member of the John L. Nau III Center for Civil War History, University of Virginia College and Graduate School of Arts & Sciences.

Career 
In 1979, Jordan began working as an archivist at the University of Virginia. Since then, he has held several different positions including university records manager and associate curator of technical services. His responsibilities involve outreach, reference, answering inquiries, processing, organizing, recommendations and special project work. In 2003, Jordan was named the senior consulting archivist on the University of Virginia's possible collaboration with the University of Botswana.

He spent many years on a solo project of processing the papers of Armstead L. Robinson (1947-1955). These files and papers encompass "the development of black studies during the 1960s; the 19th century American South; the Civil War and Reconstruction; and life as an African American student and faculty member at Yale, the State University of New York, the University of Rochester, UCLA, and the University of Virginia from the 1960s through the 1990s."

He has studied African American history, especially the Civil War, extensively. In a 2017 interview with John Coski of the American Civil War Museum, Jordan explains the power of monuments and statues:There are an estimated 13,000 Civil War memorials in the United States. Far too often throughout American history, statues and civic spaces have been ostensibly weaponized as a means of empowerment or oppression. Unquestionably, Confederate monuments reflect the politicized racial attitudes of their communities but in this case somebody’s heroes are usually someone else’s villains. Many Americans consider them racist because they openly honor secessionist proslavery war heroes--and traitors. None denounces slavery. Given the current pugnacious political climate, we must understand why Confederate monument defenders stridently praise those who defended slavery and secession while a new interracial post-civil rights generation demands their removal as evocative of sanctified traitors, racist slaveholders and white supremacy.Many of his writings encompass the duality of the Civil War, black soldiers fighting against or for slavery, and the repercussions of the war's outcome. He often specifically notes statues and monuments of the Civil War and their impact both when they were built and today.

He is most well-known, perhaps, for his book, Black Confederates and Afro-Yankees in Civil War Virginia. He studies Virginia, as it had more African-Americans right before the Civil War than any other state. His work explains their significance in the Civil War and shaping the American consciousness. It covers both enslaved and free blacks as well as Confederate and Union black soldiers.

Affiliations 
Jordan is a member of the Society of American Archivists, the Organization of American Historians, Phi Alpha Theta, the Association for the Study of African-American Life and History, and the Southern Historical Association. He is also a member for the State Historical Records Advisory Board, the Jamestown-Yorktown Board of Trustees, the Jamestown-Yorktown Foundation 2019 Commemoration Steering Committee, and the President's Commission on Slavery and the University. In 2018, Jordan was selected to begin a three year term as a member of the Albemarle Charlottesville Historical Society Board of Directors.

Jordan is also a member of the SAA's Archivists and Archives of Color Roundtable. He is passionate about the importance of diversity in archives and explains in an interview with the SAA Newsletter, Archival Outlook:...though we like to think of the 21st century as one of ever-increasing globalization and an increasingly culturally diverse society, as an African American I’m concerned by the persistence of racism in the archival workplace. I’ve lectured on this subject at conferences and am a long-standing member of SAA’s Archivists & Archives of Color Roundtable. We should not just define diversity. We must practice and embrace it.Jordan has also appeared on episodes of television shows, including TLC's Who Do You Think You Are?, which aims to help celebrities explore their heritage and genealogy. He appeared in season two's episode on Lionel Richie as an archivist and researcher looking to explore Richie's family tree.

Jordan also appeared in the PBS television documentary series, American Experience. He is titled as a historian in the 2011 episode on Robert E. Lee where he helps to explore the controversial figure's past.

He has also been invited to speak at panels and events televised by C-SPAN, most which pertain to African American history, genealogy and Civil War and slavery topics.

In 2018, he was selected by UVA President Teresa A. Sullivan to join the President's Commission on the University in the Age of Segregation.

Awards 
In 1994, Old Dominion University's Phi Kappa Theta awarded him their Outstanding Alumnus Award.

In 2008, Jordan won the Black Community Advocate Award from the Black Leadership Institute, the University of Virginia Chapter of the NAACP and Black Student Alliance.

In 2015, Jordan was one of two faculty members who received recognition from the University of Virginia's Office of African American Affairs, for his work and dedication to education.

Publications 

 Nineteenth Virginia Infantry (Virginia Regimental Histories Series), 1987
 Black Confederates and Afro-Yankees in Civil War Virginia, 1995
 Black Southerners in Gray, 1997
 New Perspectives on the Civil War: Myths and Realities of the National Conflict, 1998
 Charlottesville and the University of Virginia in the Civil War, 1998

Other notable works include essays and articles which have appeared in academic journals and encyclopedias such as The Encyclopedia of the United States in the Nineteenth Century, The Western Journal of Black Studies, Voices from within the Veil: African Americans and the Experience of Democracy, and biographical sketches of Afro-Virginian Reconstruction politicians in Encyclopedia Virginia.

References 

American archivists
Living people
American genealogists
Year of birth missing (living people)